The 2004 ECAC Hockey Men's Ice Hockey Tournament was the 43rd tournament in league history. It was played between March 5 and March 20, 2004. First Round and Quarterfinal games were played at home team campus sites, while the final four games were played at the Pepsi Arena in Albany, New York. By winning the tournament, Harvard received the ECAC's automatic bid to the 2004 NCAA Division I Men's Ice Hockey Tournament.

Format
The tournament featured four rounds of play. The teams that finish above fifth place in the standings receive a bye to the quarterfinal round. In the first round, the fifth and twelfth seeds, the sixth and eleventh seeds, the seventh and tenth seeds and the eighth and ninth seeds played a best-of-three series with the winners advancing to the quarterfinals. In the quarterfinals the one seed plays the lowest remaining seed, the second seed plays the second-lowest remaining seed, the third seed plays the third-lowest remaining seed and the fourth seed plays the fourth-lowest remaining seed another best-of-three series with the winners of these the series advancing to the Semifinals. In the semifinals the top remaining seed plays the lowest remaining seed while the two remaining teams play against each other. The winners of the semifinals play in the championship game while the losers play in a third-place game. All series after the quarterfinals are single-elimination games. The tournament champion receives an automatic bid to the 2004 NCAA Men's Division I Ice Hockey Tournament.

Conference standings
Note: GP = Games played; W = Wins; L = Losses; T = Ties; PTS = Points; GF = Goals For; GA = Goals Against

Bracket
Teams are reseeded after the First Round and Quarterfinals

Note: * denotes overtime period(s)

First round

(5) Rensselaer vs. (12) Princeton

(6) Harvard vs. (11) Vermont

(7) Yale vs. (10) St. Lawrence

(8) Union vs. (9) Clarkson

Quarterfinals

(1) Colgate vs. (10) St. Lawrence

(2) Cornell vs. (9) Clarkson

(3) Brown vs. (6) Harvard

(4) Dartmouth vs. (5) Rensselaer

Semifinals

(1) Colgate vs. (9) Clarkson

(4) Dartmouth vs. (6) Harvard

Third place

(1) Colgate vs. (4) Dartmouth

Championship

(6) Harvard vs. (9) Clarkson

Tournament awards

All-Tournament Team
F Tom Cavanagh (Harvard)
F Brendan Bernakevitch* (Harvard)
F Tristan Lush (Clarkson)
D Dave McCulloch (Harvard)
D Michael Grenzy (Clarkson)
G Dov Grumet-Morris (Harvard)
* Most Outstanding Player(s)

Tournament Three Stars
3 Rob Brown (Harvard)
2 Dustin Traylen (Dartmouth)
1 Tom Cavanagh (Cornell)

References

External links
ECAC Hockey

ECAC Hockey Men's Ice Hockey Tournament
ECAC tournament